is the professional name of , a Japanese writer and professor. Nakazawa has won the Gunzo Prize for New Writers and the Noma Literary New Face Prize, and two of her novels have been adapted for film. Since 2005 she has been a professor of literature at Hosei University.

Early life and education 
Nakazawa was born in Yokohama in 1959.  Her family later moved to Tateyama, Chiba, where Nakazawa's father died in 1970. At the age of 18 Nakazawa wrote , a sexually explicit story about a high school girl whose unrequited love for a male classmate leads to conflict with her mother. Umi o kanjiru toki won the 1978 Gunzo Prize for New Writers and sold over 600,000 copies in Japan. Nakazawa attended Meiji University, and married her husband while still a student.

Career 

Nakazawa followed Umi o kanjiru toki with the novel  and the short story collection . In 1985, when Nakazawa was 25 years old, her mother died at the age of 40. That same year, Nakazawa published , which won the 7th Noma Literary New Face Prize. After she won the award, her marriage ended in divorce. In subsequent years Nakazawa wrote several more books, including the 1999 novel , about childhood sweethearts who have a love affair despite being involved with other people, and the 2000 novel , a story about junior high school students in a brass band.

Since 2005 Nakazawa has been a professor of literature at Hosei University. In 2007 Nakazawa was the subject of one volume of Kanae Shobō's Contemporary Women Writer Readers series of books, each of which compiles selections from an author's works, an annotated bibliography, and critical essays from other authors. In 2013 a film adaptation of her novel Gakutai no usagi, starring Masaru Miyazaki and directed by Takuji Suzuki, premiered at the 26th Tokyo International Film Festival. A film adaptation of her novel Umi o kanjiru toki, directed by Hiroshi Ando and starring Yui Ichikawa, and based on a decades-old Haruhiko Arai script that Nakazawa originally refused to allow to be filmed, was released in 2014. Umi o kanjiru toki held its international premiere at the 2015 Rotterdam Film Festival under the English title Undulant Fever.

In addition to her fiction writing, Nakazawa is an essayist who regularly writes opinion columns on current events for Asahi Shimbun. In 2015 she published the nonfiction book , a series of conversations with professionals from different fields about the rise of hate speech.

Recognition
 1978 – 21st Gunzo Prize for New Writers
 1985 – 7th Noma Literary New Face Prize

Bibliography
 , Kodansha, 1978, 
 , Kawade Shobo Shinsha, 1981, 
 , Kodansha, 1981, 
 , Kodansha, 1985, 
 , Kodansha, 1999, 
 , Shinchosha, 2000, 
 , Jinbun Shoin, 2015,

Film adaptations
 Gakutai no usagi, 2013
 Umi o kanjiru toki (Undulant Fever), 2014

References

1959 births
Living people
20th-century Japanese women writers
20th-century Japanese novelists
21st-century Japanese novelists
21st-century Japanese women writers
Japanese women novelists
Japanese women academics
People from Yokohama
People from Tateyama, Chiba